Mei Ju-ao (7 November 1904 – 23 April 1973) was a Chinese jurist, professor, politician and author.

Education
Mei was born in Nanchang, in eastern China's Jiangxi province. At the age of 12, Ju-ao was admitted into a school on the site of what is now Tsinghua University, moving from Nanchang to Beijing in pursuit of a good education. After graduating, he received financial assistance to study at Stanford University in California, graduating with a bachelor's degree in Liberal Arts in 1926. While there, he was elected a member of Phi Beta Kappa Society. Mei later received a doctorate in law (Juris Doctor) from the University of Chicago in 1928. After spending a year traveling around Europe, Mei returned to China in 1929.

He served as professor of law at Nankai University and Fudan University, as a legal adviser to the Ministry of the Interior of the Nationalist Government, and as a member of the Legislative Yuan.

Tokyo Trials
During the period of 1946–48, Mei was the Chinese judicial delegate to the International Military Tribunal for the Far East. He participated in the trials of Japanese war criminals shortly after the Second World War.

Mei was portrayed by Damian Lau in the Chinese film The Tokyo Trial (2006) and by David Tse in the NHK miniseries Tokyo Trial (2016).

People's Republic
Mei returned to China after the Tokyo Trials. He supported the Communists of Mao Zedong, and served as a member of the Chinese People's Political Consultative Conference, a special adviser to the Ministry of Foreign Affairs, executive director of the Chinese People's Institute of Foreign Affairs, and a member of the Chinese branch of the World Peace Council. He was persecuted during the Cultural Revolution.

Work
"China and the Rule of Law." Pacific Affairs, Vol. 5, No. 10. (Oct., 1932), pp. 863–872. (Available through JSTOR)

See also 
 The Tokyo Trial (film)

References

Chinese jurists
People from Nanchang
1904 births
1973 deaths
National Tsing Hua University alumni
Stanford University alumni
University of Chicago Law School alumni
Judges of the International Military Tribunal for the Far East
Delegates to the 1st National People's Congress
Members of the 3rd Chinese People's Political Consultative Conference
Members of the 4th Chinese People's Political Consultative Conference
Justice Ministers of the Republic of China
Members of the 1st Legislative Yuan
Chinese judges of international courts and tribunals
20th-century Chinese judges